Diana: Her True Story may refer to:

 Diana: Her True Story (book), a 1992 book by Andrew Morton
 Diana: Her True Story (film), a 1993 film based on Morton's book